We Are All Chubut (ChuSoTo) is a provincial political party in the Chubut Province of Argentina. It was formed in 2014 to back the candidacy to the governorship of former governor Mario Das Neves. The party split from the provincial branch of the Justicialist Party.

Since its foundation it has been aligned at the federal level with the Renewal Front, though ChuSoTo has declined to formally form part of the Frente de Todos coalition, of which the Renewal Front is a founding member. It currently holds a majority of seats in the Chubut provincial legislature and the incumbent governor, Mariano Arcioni (who first took office upon Das Neves's death in 2017), belongs to ChuSoTo.

Electoral results

Chamber of Deputies

Senate

Chubut governorship

Chubut provincial legislature

Notes

References

External links
Official website (in Spanish)

Provincial political parties in Argentina
Chubut Province
2014 establishments in Argentina
Political parties established in 2014
Peronist parties and alliances in Argentina